This is a list of notable persons who have had ties to Panthéon-Assas University.

Notable alumni
Manuel Aeschlimann, former member of the French National Assembly
Michèle Alliot-Marie, former French minister of justice, minister of the interior, minister of defence, minister of foreign and European affairs, minister of youth affairs and sports, member of the French National Assembly and former president of the Rally for the Republic
Antoine Andraos, member of the Lebanese Parliament
Gabriel Attal, French government spokesperson
Martine Aubry,  first secretary of the Socialist Party of France, mayor of Lille, former minister of social affairs, minister of labour, employment and vocational training, and member of the French National Assembly
Joaquim Barbosa, chief justice of Brazil
François Baroin, member of the French National Assembly, former French minister of finance, minister of the interior, and minister for overseas territories
Martine Billard, member of the French National Assembly
Yves Bot, advocate general of the European Court of Justice
Mohamed Najib Boulif,  Moroccan minister delegate for general affairs and governance
Franck Boulin, former secretary-general of the Assembly of Kosovo
Christine Boutin, former French minister of housing and the city, and former member of the French National Assembly
Bernard Carayon, member of the French National Assembly
Sabino Cassese, judge of the Constitutional Court of Italy and former Italian minister of civil service
Anna Chalon, French singer-songwriter and guitarist
Claire Chazal, journalist
Claude Chirac,  advisor to former President of France Jacques Chirac
Jean-Paul Cluzel, president of the Réunion des musées nationaux et du Grand Palais des Champs-Élysées, LGBT rights activist, former general inspector of finances and former managing director of the Paris Opera 
Jean-Marie Colombani, director of Le Monde from 1994 to 2007
Milica Čubrilo, Serbian ambassador to Tunisia and former Serbian minister of diaspora
Rachida Dati, member of the European Parliament and former French minister of justice
Olivier De Schutter, legal scholar and United Nations Special Rapporteur
Patrick Devedjian, member of the French National Assembly, former minister in charge of the implementation of the recovery plan, minister of industry, minister of local liberties and advisor to former President of France Nicolas Sarkozy
Sophie De Wit, member of the Belgian Chamber of Representatives, former member of the Flemish Parliament
Francisco Javier Domínguez Brito, Dominican minister of labour, former attorney general of the Dominican Republic and senator for the province of Santiago
Emmanuel Gaillard, chairman of the International Arbitration Institute and former professor at Harvard Law School
Nadim Gemayel,  member of the Lebanese Parliament
Henri Giscard d'Estaing, French businessman and son of former President of France Valéry Giscard d'Estaing
Claude Goasguen, member of the French National Assembly and former minister
Bruno Gollnisch, member of the European Parliament and former member of the French National Assembly
 Mattias Guyomar, French judge at the European Court of Human Rights
Pierre Damien Habumuremyi, prime minister of Rwanda and former minister of education of Rwanda
Éric Halphen, French judge
Raphaël Haroche, French singer-songwriter and actor
Gahoun Georges Hégbor, former member of the National Assembly of Togo and former Togolese minister of communication and civic education
Anne-Marie Idrac, former secretary of State for foreign trade and former member of the French National Assembly
Dali Jazi,  former Tunisian minister of defence, minister of higher education, and minister of public health
Yves Jégo, member of the French National Assembly and former secretary of State for Overseas
Giorgos Kaminis, mayor of Athens and former Greek ombudsman
Assad Kotaite Secretary-General and Council President of the International Civil Aviation Organization
Axelle Lemaire, member of the French National Assembly
Corinne Lepage, member of the European parliament, former French minister of the environment
Jean-Marie Le Pen, president of the Front National, member of the European Parliament and former member of the French National Assembly
Marine Le Pen, president of the Front National, member of the European Parliament
Gérard Longuet, member of the Senate of France, former member of the French National Assembly, former member of the European Parliament, former minister of posts and former minister of defence
Ivan Lozowy, Ukrainian political activist and  founder of the Institute for Statehood and Democracy in Ukraine
Victorin Lurel, minister of overseas France and former member of the French National Assembly
Alain Madelin, former French minister of economy and finance, former minister of posts, former member of the French National Assembly, former president of Démocratie Libérale
Marion Maréchal-Le Pen, member of the French National Assembly
Andréas D. Mavroyiannis, former Cypriot Deputy Minister for European Affairs
Carlos Eduardo Medellín Becerra, former ambassador of Colombia to the United Kingdom, and former minister of justice and law of Colombia
Jamshid Momtaz, former member and chairman of the International Law Commission
Éric de Montgolfier, French judge
Hervé Morin, leader of the New Centre, member of the French National Assembly and former minister of defence
Khalid Naciri, former minister of communications and spokesperson of the government of Morocco
Alexandre Najjar, Lebanese writer
Néstor Osorio Londoño, permanent representative of Colombia to the United Nations, former permanent representative of Colombia to the International Coffee Organization and executive director of the International Coffee Organization, former and first permanent representative of Colombia to the World Trade Organization
Prokopis Pavlopoulos, president of Greece, former member of the Hellenic Parliament and former Greek minister of the interior
Alain Pellet, former member and chairman of the International Law Commission
Saddek Rabah, Algerian researcher and Professor
Daniel Picouly, French writer
Panagiotis Pikrammenos,  former interim prime minister of Greece and former president of the Greek Council of State
Jean-Pierre Raffarin, member of the Senate of France, former member of the European Parliament, and former prime minister of France and former minister of commerce and industry
Manuela Ramin-Osmundsen, former Norwegian minister of children and equality
Raymond Ranjeva,  former vice-president of the International Court of Justice
Philippe Risoli, television presenter
Jean-Luc Romero, French politician, writer and leader of non-governmental organizations
Édouard Étienne de Rothschild, businessman
Catherine Samba-Panza, first female president of the Central African Republic
Julio Mario Santo Domingo Braga, Brazilian socialite
Jacques Schwarz-Bart, jazz saxophonist
Nicolas Sehnaoui,  Lebanese minister of telecommunication
Christiane Taubira, French minister of justice, former member of the French National Assembly and former member of the European Parliament
Vassiliki Thanou-Christophilou,  caretaker Prime Minister of Greece from 27 August to 21 September 2015 and former President of the Greek Court of Cassation
Pol Theis, interior designer and founder of P&T Interiors
Jean Tiberi, member of the French National Assembly, mayor of the 5th arrondissement of Paris and former mayor of Paris
Daniel Turp, member of the National Assembly of Quebec
Evangelos Venizelos, president of the Panhellenic Socialist Movement, member of the Greek Parliament, former deputy prime minister of Greece, former Greek minister of finance, minister of national defence, minister of culture and sport, minister of development, minister of justice, minister of transport and communications, and minister of the press and the media
Dominique de Villepin, former prime minister of France, former minister of the interior and former minister of foreign affairs
Éric Woerth, member of the French National Assembly, former French minister of budget and minister of labour
Gaël Yanno, former member of the French National Assembly

Notable faculty
Fabrice d'Almeida
Edmond Alphandéry, former French minister of economy
Philippe Ardant, former president of the Constitutional Court of the principality of Andorra and former president of the Arab World Institute
Jean-Michel Blanquer, former Minister of Education joined the faculty in 2022 as professor of civil and constitutional law.
Frank Bournois
Jean Carbonnier
Nicole Catala, former member of the French National Assembly
Dominique Chagnollaud, former member of the Supreme Court of Monaco
Gérard Cornu
Pierre Delvolvé,  member of the Académie des sciences morales et politiques and former vice-president of the Supreme Court of Monaco
Roland Drago, former president of the Supreme Court of Monaco and former president of the Académie des sciences morales et politiques
Yves Gaudemet, member of the Académie des sciences morales et politiques
Serge Guinchard
Jean-Claude Martinez, member of the European Parliament and former member of the French National Assembly
David Naccache, forensic expert and member of the Computer Science Laboratory of the École normale supérieure
Hugues Portelli, member of the Senate of France
Albert Rigaudière, member of the Académie des inscriptions et belles-lettres
Jacques Robert
Roger-Gérard Schwartzenberg, member of the French National Assembly, former minister of research and former member of the European Parliament
François Terré, member of the Académie des sciences morales et politiques
Georges Vedel, member of the Académie française and former member of the Constitutional Council of France
Joe Verhoeven, secretary general of the Institute of International Law
Louis Vogel
Prosper Weil, member of the Académie des sciences morales et politiques

References

Paris 2 Panthéon-Assas University people
Lists of people by university or college in France